Veronika Bauer (born October 17, 1979 in Toronto, Ontario) is a Canadian freestyle skier.

Bauer competes in aerials, and made her World Cup debut in August 1997 at  Mount Buller in Australia. Her first World Cup podium also came at that venue, two years later. Her first career World Cup win came in 2002, when she won an event at Lake Placid.

Over her career, Bauer has placed on the podium at World Cup events 18 times, with four of these being victories. Her most successful season came in 2003, as she placed 3rd overall in the World Cup standings. That season saw her claim three of her four titles, two at Mt. Buller and one in Fernie. She has made the podium twice at the World Championships. She won a gold medal at Whistler in 2001, then finished less than three points behind Alisa Camplin to earn silver in 2003.

Bauer has competed in three Olympic games, 2002, 2006 and 2010. In the first two she made the final, with her top finish 10th place in 2002. In 2006, she finished 12th and last in the final, after qualifying in 5th place. 
At the 2010 event she qualified third after the first qualifying jump, but a disastrous second jump cost her a place in the finals.

World Cup Podiums

References

External links

 FIS profile
 

1979 births
Living people
Olympic freestyle skiers of Canada
Freestyle skiers at the 2002 Winter Olympics
Freestyle skiers at the 2006 Winter Olympics
Freestyle skiers at the 2010 Winter Olympics
Skiers from Toronto
Canadian female freestyle skiers